The following is a list of California locations by race.

According to 2010 data from the U.S. Census Bureau, Whites were the dominant racial group in California, comprising 61.8 percent of its population of 36,969,200. The county with the highest percentage of whites was Nevada County (93.4 percent). The ten counties with the highest percentage of whites were all relatively small. They had an average population of 60,460, and none had a population of over 200,000. In contrast, the counties with the lowest percentage of whites were much larger, with an average population of 1,999,943. The smallest of these counties was Solano County, with a population of 411,620. All counties in California had a White majority, except Alameda County. White was the only reported racial group in 142 places, comprising one in ten of the total. The largest of these places was Forest Meadows, with a population of 1,546. Most of the ten places with the lowest reported percentage of whites were in Los Angeles County, and two of these places — Buck Meadows and Lookout — reported only racial categories other than White.

Asian was the third most commonly reported race in California, behind some other race. Asians comprised 13.1 percent (4,825,271) of California's population. San Francisco County had the highest percentage of Asians of any county in California (33.5 percent). Of the thirteen counties in which Asians comprised more than 10 percent of the population, the average had a population of 1,138,957. The ten counties with the lowest percentages of Asians were small (with an average population of 28,348) and landlocked. Of the nineteen places in California with the largest percentages of Asians, thirteen were in Los Angeles County, all but two very small places had a population of at least 7,000, and all but three had a population of at least 10,000. Buck Meadows, with a reported population of 12, was the only place in which Asian was the only reported racial group. Monterey Park, with a population of 60,251, had the highest percentage of Asians (65.4 percent) for all places with a population larger than 100. Asians are a rather concentrated racial group, with roughly one-third (490) of California's places reporting no Asians whatsoever, and only about one place in ten (183) reporting percentages of Asians greater than or equal to the state percentage.

Black or African American was the fourth most commonly reported racial group in California, comprising 6.1 percent (2,252,129) of the state's population, roughly half that of Asians. Solano County had the highest percentage of those reporting Black or African American as their race (14.6 percent), and they surpassed 10 percent in two other counties: Alameda (12.5 percent) and Sacramento (10.2 percent). Alpine County was the only county which reported exclusively racial groups other than Black or African American. Of the ten counties in California with the lowest percentage of Blacks or African Americans, all are relatively small (with an average population of 86,038), and all but Santa Cruz County are landlocked. In contrast, most of the ten counties with the highest percentages of Blacks or African Americans had rather high populations, with an average population of 1,918,645. View Park-Windsor Hills had the highest percentage of Blacks or African Americans of all places in California (83.8 percent), and all places reporting a majority of this racial group were in Los Angeles County. This racial group was even more concentrated than Asians were, with roughly four in ten (603) places not reporting this racial group at all and with only about place in ten (201) reporting a concentration above that of the state.

Native Americans, defined in this article as the sum of those reported their race as American Indian, Alaska Native, Native Hawaiian, or other Pacific Islanders, comprised more than 10 percent of the population in two counties: Alpine County (22.1 percent) and Inyo County (10.4 percent). Crows Landing had the highest percentage of Native Americans of any place in California (62.8 percent), and Native Americans comprised a majority of the population in a total of six places. In no case did a place that reported more than 10 percent of its population as Native American have a population of over 5,000. The place with the highest concentration of Native Americans and with a population of over 5,000 was East Palo Alto, in which 9.8 percent of the population was Native American.

Hispanic or Latino was the most commonly reported race or ethnic group in California other than White. Hispanics or Latinos may be of any race, but they report their race as either White or some other race in the vast majority of cases (see Relation between ethnicity and race in census results). They comprised 37.2 percent (13,752,743) of California's total population and comprised the majority of the population in eight counties. Of these counties, Imperial County reported the highest concentration (79.6 percent). Notably, Imperial County also borders Mexico. Of the ten counties which reported the highest concentration of Hispanics or Latinos, all but Monterey County were landlocked. On the other hand, the ten counties which reported the lowest concentrations of Hispanic or Latinos were also all landlocked. None of these counties have populations over 200,000 and their average population was 65,633. The county that reported the lowest concentration of Hispanics or Latinos was Trinity County (6.7 percent) with a population of just 13,711. Although San Diego County also borders Mexico, it nevertheless had a lower percentage of Hispanics or Latinos than nearby counties which don't.

Hispanics or Latinos comprised roughly the entire population in twelve places, the largest of these being Del Rey, with a population of 1,625. Another one of these places, Kettleman City, also had a population of more than 1,000. These places are also all located in either Tulare County or Fresno County. Sixty-seven places in total had concentrations of Hispanics or Latinos above 90 percent; the largest of these places was East Los Angeles. Three hundred and twenty-nine places, roughly one in five, had a majority. Roughly one in ten (190) places reported no Hispanics or Latinos, and in no case did the populations of these places exceed 3,000. The largest of these places was Kelly Ridge, with a population of 2,246.

Entire state

Counties

Cities and unincorporated places

See also 

 California
 California locations by crime rate
 California locations by income
 California locations by voter registration
 Demographics of California

Notes

References 

California geography-related lists
Demographics of California